Will of the Iranian Nation Party ( Hezb-e Erâde-ye Mellat-e Irân; abbreviated HAMA,  Hâmâ) is an Iranian reformist political party and officially founded in 2001, formed by students of University of Tehran's School of Law and Political Science in early 1990s. The party is a member of Council for coordinating the Reforms Front and Tehran councilor Ahmad Hakimipour is its secretary general. The party supported Mohammad Khatami in the 2001 Iranian presidential election.

References 

Reformist political groups in Iran
Political parties established in 2001